The Château de Bellegarde is a château in Lamonzie-Montastruc, Dordogne, Nouvelle-Aquitaine, France. The structure originates in the 14th century although the interiors are of the 20th century. It has been a listed historical monument since 2006.

References

Châteaux in Dordogne
Monuments historiques of Dordogne